Botswana competed at the 1986 Commonwealth Games. They sent twenty-two athletes in two sports, including their first woman in athletics. They also won their first medal.

Medals

Athletics

Men's 100 metres
Sunday Maweni

Men's 200 metres
Sunday Maweni

Men's 400 metres
Zacharia Machangani

Men's 800 metres
Joseph Ramotshabi

Men's 1500 metres
Mbiganyi Thee

Men's 4x400 metre relay
Zacharia Machangani
Sunday Maweni
Joseph Ramotshabi
Mbiganyi Thee

Men's marathon
Bigboy Josie Matlapeng
Johnson Mbangiwa
Golekane Mosweu

Women's marathon
Vanessa Tilbury

Lawn Bowls
Men's Singles
Men's Doubles
Men's Fours

Women's Singles
Women's Doubles
Women's Fours

Sources
 Official results by country

Botswana at the Commonwealth Games
Nations at the 1986 Commonwealth Games
Commonwealth Games